Chlororithra is a genus of moths in the family Geometridae erected by Arthur Gardiner Butler in 1889.

Species
Some species of this genus are:
Chlororithra fea Butler, 1889 (from China, Tibet, India, Nepal, Bhutan, Burma & Pakistan)
Chlororithra missioniaria  Oberthür, 1916 (from China)

References

Butler, 1889. Illustrations of Typical Specimens of Lepidoptera Heterocera in the Collection of the British Museum. 7: 22 (index), 106

Geometrinae